The 1978 San Francisco 49ers season was the franchise's 29th season in the National Football League and their 33rd overall. The team began the season hoping to improve upon their previous output of 5–9. Instead, the team started the season 0–4 for the second straight year. The team also suffered a nine-game losing streak.

During the off-season, the 49ers acquired running back O. J. Simpson, who originally hailed from San Francisco, from the Buffalo Bills. Although Simpson had been one of the best backs in the league over the previous decade, he was in poor physical condition and had recently undergone knee surgery. As a result, his playing ability was limited.

The 49ers finished with the worst record in the league and scored only 219 points the fewest in the league in 1978. Making matters worse is that the first pick in the 1979 NFL Draft was traded to the Bills as part of the Simpson deal. The team set an NFL record with 63 turnovers.

The last remaining active member of the 1978 San Francisco 49ers was quarterback Steve DeBerg, who played his final NFL game in the 1998 season, although he missed the 1994 - 1997 seasons.

Personnel

Staff

Roster

Schedule

Standings

References 

San Francisco 49ers seasons
San Francisco 49ers
1978 in San Francisco
San